Sedley Cooper (1911 – after 1938) was an English professional footballer, who played for Halifax Town, Sheffield Wednesday, Huddersfield Town and Notts County.

References

1911 births
Year of death missing
People from Garforth
English footballers
Association football midfielders
Halifax Town A.F.C. players
Sheffield Wednesday F.C. players
Huddersfield Town A.F.C. players
Notts County F.C. players
English Football League players